This is a list of episodes for the sixth season (1980–81) of the NBC television series Quincy, M.E..

This season started later than usual due to a writers' strike, and the opening theme is again rearranged.

Episodes

References

External links
 

1980 American television seasons
1981 American television seasons